USS Kirkpatrick (DE-318) was an Edsall-class destroyer escort built for the U.S. Navy during World War II. She served in the Atlantic Ocean the Pacific Ocean and provided destroyer escort protection against submarine and air attack for Navy vessels and convoys. Post-war, she was converted to a radar picket ship to support the DEW Line.

Namesake
Thomas L. Kirkpatrick was born on 5 July 1887, in Cozad, Nebraska. He was appointed Acting Chaplain, U.S. Navy on 19 February 1918. He died when Arizona was sunk during the Japanese Attack on Pearl Harbor on 7 December 1941.

Construction and commissioning
She was launched 5 June 1943, by Consolidated Steel Corp., Orange, Texas, sponsored by Mrs. Genevieve Kirkpatrick, widow of Captain Kirkpatrick, and commissioned 23 October 1943.

World War II North Atlantic operations
 
After shakedown along the Atlantic Coast, Kirkpatrick arrived Norfolk, Virginia, 23 December 1943, to commence transatlantic escort duty. From January 1944 to May 1945 she made one convoy escort mission to the Mediterranean, and 10 crossings between the United States and the British Isles. On her third voyage,  another escort in the convoy rammed the  after the U-boat had sunk tanker . Eleven prisoners from the sunken enemy submarine were captured in this action of 16 April 1944.

Transfer to the Pacific Fleet  
 
Kirkpatrick returned New York on completion of her final transatlantic escort mission 15 May 1945. After bombardment exercises in the Caribbean, she sailed for the Pacific. She entered Pearl Harbor 11 July, for tactics with submarines in Hawaiian waters until 29 August when she departed on an escort cruise to the Far East Departing Sasebo 2 November, Kirkpatrick arrived Charleston, South Carolina, 8 December 1945, via Pearl Harbor and the Panama Canal. She arrived Jacksonville, Florida, 5 days later and decommissioned 1 May 1946, at Green Cove Springs, Florida.

Converted to Radar Picket Ship 
 
Kirkpatrick was reclassified a radar picket ship (DER-318) on 1 October 1951, and recommissioned 23 February 1952. After shakedown and training out of Guantanamo Bay, Cuba, Kirkpatrick reported to Newport, Rhode Island, 11 July 1952, for radar picket operations on the Atlantic Barrier, the seaward extension of the Distant Early Warning (DEW) line across northern Canada. She manned radar picket stations in the North Atlantic until 1960, a seaborne unit of the air defense system of the United States and Canada. Incidental to this service she visited ports of northern Europe in the summers of 1958 and 1959. The radar picket ship departed Newport 27 March 1960, and arrived Philadelphia, Pennsylvania, 2 days later.

Final Decommissioning 

She decommissioned there 24 June 1960, and entered the Atlantic Reserve Fleet. She was struck from the Navy list on 1 August 1974 and was sold for scrapping 12 March 1975.

References

External links 
 Dictionary of American Naval Fighting Ships
 Thomas L. Kirkpatrick was born 5 July 1887
 NavSource Online: Destroyer Escort Photo Archive – USS Kirkpatrick (DE-318)

Edsall-class destroyer escorts
Ships built in Orange, Texas
1943 ships
World War II frigates and destroyer escorts of the United States